The 1989 World Club Challenge (also known as the Foster's World Club Challenge due to sponsorship by brewers, Foster's) was the third ever and first official World Club Challenge match. 1989's NSWRL season premiers, the Canberra Raiders travelled to England to play 1988–89 RFL champions, Widnes.

Background

Widnes

Widnes came into the World Club Challenge having won two straight Stones Bitter Premierships. Coach Doug Laughton's team had won many admirers throughout England for their free-flowing, attacking style of rugby. At this time player poaching from rugby union was at a level not seen in decades, and the Chemics benefited from a board flush with cash and a coach with a keen eye for talent. Three members of their famed back division all came from the amateur code. Alan Tait started in union for Scotland but had grown up around league as his father played for Workington Town in the Borders. Jonathan Davies cited a need to provide for a young family and heavy pressure as Wales five-eighth as his motivation for accepting a then-record £230,000 signing fee. Finally Martin Offiah desired to prove doubters wrong, whether they be Southern union power-brokers put off by his unapologetic blackness or St. Helens scouts who passed him over, believing he was "an uncoordinated clown". Combining with home-grown talents like Andy Currier, the Hulme brothers and Tony Myler, the Chemics scored an eye-popping 726 points in the 1988-89 league, winning the title over Wigan by three points.

Canberra Raiders

The 1989 NSWRL season was the 8th in the history of Australian club the Canberra Raiders. Coached by Tim Sheens and captained by Australian international centre Mal Meninga, the Raiders finished the minor rounds in 4th spot. They then won through to their second ever Grand Final (after playing in the 1987 game) where they made history by not only being the first team to win the premiership from 4th spot or lower after defeating Balmain in the Grand Final, but also by becoming the first non-Sydney team to win the premiership in its history dating back to 1908.

Teams

Details

The match was played on Wednesday, 4 October at Old Trafford, Manchester. A crowd of 30,786 saw an all-action game of two halves, with a Mal Meninga-inspired Canberra opening up a 12-0 lead by playing a brand of rugby that BBC commentator Ray French described as "like basketball". However Widnes' offload game would bring them back into the match, with tries by Offiah and Paul Hulme both coming as a result of good late passes to make it 12-8 at the interval. The match turned in the second half when Jonathan Davies was clothes-lined across the chin by Laurie Daley in the act of scoring a try: Daley could call himself lucky to only be given a sin-bin by the French referee. Widnes would consolidate the man-advantage by crossing the Stretford End try-line twice courtesy of Offiah and Eyres, adding a Darren Wright try as insurance while Steve Walters would got a valedictory four-pointer for the Australians. David Hulme was named man-of-the-match.

References

External links
1989 World Club Challenge at rugbyleagueproject.com
1989 World Club Challenge at superleague.co.uk
1989 World Club Challenge at eraofthebiff.com
1989 World Club Challenge at rugby.widnes.tv

World Club Challenge
Canberra Raiders matches
Widnes Vikings matches
World Club Challenge
World Club Challenge
World Club Challenge